A.S. Pescina Valle del Giovenco, commonly referred to as simply Valle del Giovenco, was an Italian association football club based in Pescina, Abruzzo. Though they were based in Pescina, the team was temporarily playing in Avezzano, a nearby city.

History

It was founded in 2005.

In 2006, Valle del Giovenco gained promotion from Eccellenza after winning the promotion play-offs. The following year, the squad gained a second consecutive promotion by winning Round F of the Serie D promotion play-offs. The club then played in Serie C2 in the 2007–2008 season.

Following the promotions, the club started a rebranding process that included the relocation to Avezzano to accommodate their quickly advancing position on the Italian football scene. The club already define themselves as representative of the city of Avezzano, starting from their official website and changed their crest that features a wolf in white and green color scheme, which is clearly reminiscent of the now defunct Nuova Avezzano Calcio franchise. Moreover, the club has signed a sponsorship deal with the comune of Avezzano.

Bankruptcy
Following its bankruptcy in 2010, it was folded at the end of the 2009–10 Lega Pro Prima Divisione.

Former coaches
  Roberto Cappellacci (2006–2007;2009)
  Andrea Chiappini (2008)
  Carlo Perrone (2008–2009)
  Dario Bonetti (2009–2010)

References

Defunct football clubs in Italy
Football clubs in Abruzzo
Association football clubs established in 2005
Association football clubs disestablished in 2010
Serie C clubs
2005 establishments in Italy
2010 disestablishments in Italy